Shijiu Lake() is a freshwater lake in eastern China, situated at the lower reaches of the Yangtze River. One half of the lake that is to the west, belongs to the Dangtu County of Anhui Province and the other part lies in the Gaochun and Lishui Districts of Nanjing, Jiangsu Province.

References

Lakes of Anhui
Lakes of Jiangsu